Love It or List It Vancouver, known as Love It or List it Too in the United States, is a Canadian home design reality TV series airing on the W Network. The show was the first spin off from Love It or List It and was the second show in the Love it or List It franchise. The show is produced by Big Coat Productions and is based in the Greater Vancouver area and other surrounding areas in British Columbia, Canada.

The show premiered as a prime-time program on W Network in January 2013. It stars former The Bachelor and The Bachelorette star Jillian Harris, and real estate agent Todd Talbot. In the United States, the show is titled Love It or List It, Too, and airs on the HGTV network.

In Canada, new episodes of season three started airing on July 6, 2015, on W Network at 10pm; in the US new episodes of Love It or List It, Too (the US title, season five)  started airing on July 24, 2015.

In November 2017, the series was planning to film in the Okanagan valley.

Storyline
In each episode of Love It or List It Vancouver, a couple or family is faced with the decision of whether or not their current home is the right home for them. With a list of what they would need to change in their current home, and what they would need in a new home, both hosts - a designer and a realtor - come in to try to help make the decision easier. The designer attempts to win over the homeowners by renovating their current home, and the realtor tries to find them the home of their dreams.

Host and crew biographies

Hosts 
Jillian Harris –  Born on December 30, 1979, in Peace River, Alberta, Canada, she is best known for her work on ABC's The Bachelor and The Bachelorette. Harris also worked as a designer on ABC's Extreme Makeover Home Edition. She now returns home to Canada, competing against her co-host and rival, Todd Talbot. Like Hilary Farr, her job is to make clients on the show regain their love for their home again.
Todd Talbot – Born on June 12, 1973, in Vancouver, British Columbia, Canada, he is a former actor, now a realtor, and is co-host and rival of Jillian Harris. He has been married to international singer and model Rebecca Talbot since March 2007. They have a son and a daughter. Like David Visentin, his job is to get clients on the show to list their home for a better opportunity.

Design Team 
Jillian has a design team who works with her on each episode.  Francesca Albertazzi heads up the team with Megan Bennett, Sarah Johnson and Farah Malik.

Contractor 
Kenny Gemmill - is Jillian's general contractor, also a fire fighter and owner of Kits Construction and Development Ltd based in Vancouver. He oversees all the construction teams working on the show

Episodes
Victories for Jillian are families or clients who decided to love their home and stay. Victories for Todd are families and clients who decided to list and move into a new or better home.

Series overview

Season 1

Season 2

Season 3

Season 4

Season 5

See also
 Love It or List It
 Property Brothers
 Candice Tells All
 Fixer Upper

References

External links
 https://web.archive.org/web/20170804105411/http://www.wnetwork.com/shows/love-it-or-list-it-vancouver
 http://www.hgtv.com/shows/love-it-or-list-it-too
 https://www.imdb.com/title/tt2665420/
 https://web.archive.org/web/20140610193152/http://www.bigcoatproductions.com/showdetail.asp?sId=12

Love It or List It
2013 Canadian television series debuts
Television shows filmed in Vancouver
2010s Canadian reality television series
Television series by Corus Entertainment
W Network original programming